Grøsfjellvatnet is a lake in Rogaland county, Norway. It is located in the municipalities of Eigersund, Lund, and Sokndal.

See also
List of lakes in Norway

References

Lakes of Rogaland
Lund, Norway
Sokndal
Eigersund